Hussein Al-Awadi (born 1944) is a former Iraqi politician and member of the Arab Socialist Ba'ath Party, Governor of Anbar in 1995, Governor of Najaf in 1996, and official of the party's organizations in Nineveh Governorate.

After the 2003 invasion
His name was included in the list of Iraqis wanted by the United States, and he was arrested on June 9, 2003. 

He was indicted in the case of the suppression of the uprising in 1991.

References

External links

1944 births

Possibly living people
20th-century Iraqi politicians
21st-century Iraqi politicians
Members of the Regional Command of the Arab Socialist Ba'ath Party – Iraq Region
Iraq War prisoners of war
Iraqi prisoners of war